May refer to:
Palace Gardens, a shopping centre in Enfield Town, United Kingdom
A dance hall that existed until 1911 at Electric Park, Detroit, United States